The Cunningham Project is a collaborative effort started in 1925 to factor numbers of the form  bn ± 1 for b = 2, 3, 5, 6, 7, 10, 11, 12 and large n. The project is named after Allan Joseph Champneys Cunningham, who published the first version of the table together with Herbert J. Woodall. There are three printed versions of the table, the most recent published in 2002, as well as an online version.

The current limits of the exponents are:

Factors of Cunningham number
Two types of factors can be derived from a Cunningham number without having to use a factorisation algorithm: algebraic factors, which depend on the exponent, and Aurifeuillian factors, which depend on both the base and the exponent.

Algebraic factors
From elementary algebra,

for all k, and

for odd k. In addition,  b2n − 1 = (bn − 1)(bn + 1). Thus, when m divides n, bm − 1 and bm + 1 are factors of bn − 1 if the quotient of n over m is even; only the first number is a factor if the quotient is odd. bm + 1 is a factor of bn − 1, if m divides n and the quotient is odd.

In fact, 

and

Aurifeuillian factors

When the number is of a particular form (the exact expression varies with the base), Aurifeuillian factorization may be used, which gives a product of two or three numbers. The following equations give Aurifeuillian factors for the Cunningham project bases as a product of F, L and M:

Let b = s2 × k with squarefree k, if one of the conditions holds, then  have Aurifeuillian factorization.
 (i)  and 
 (ii)  and

Other factors
When n is prime, both algebraic and Aurifeuillian factors are not possible, except the trivial factors (b − 1 for bn − 1 and b + 1 for bn + 1). For Mersenne numbers, the trivial factors are not possible for prime n, so all factors are of the form 2kn + 1. In general, all factors of (bn − 1)&hairsp;/(b − 1) are of the form 2kn + 1, where b ≥ 2 and n is prime, except when n divides b − 1, in which case (bn − 1)/(b − 1) is divisible by n itself.

Cunningham numbers of the form bn − 1 can only be prime if b = 2 and n is prime, assuming that n ≥ 2; these are the Mersenne numbers. Numbers of the form bn + 1 can only be prime if b is even and n is a power of 2, again assuming n ≥ 2; these are the generalized Fermat numbers, which are Fermat numbers when b = 2. Any factor of a Fermat number 22n + 1 is of the form k2n+2 + 1.

Notation
bn − 1 is denoted as b,n−. Similarly, bn + 1 is denoted as b,n+. When dealing with numbers of the form required for Aurifeuillian factorisation, b,nL and b,nM are used to denote L and M in the products above. References to b,n− and b,n+ are to the number with all algebraic and Aurifeuillian factors removed. For example, Mersenne numbers are of the form 2,n− and Fermat numbers are of the form 2,2n+; the number Aurifeuille factored in 1871 was the product of 2,58L and 2,58M.

See also
Cunningham number
ECMNET and NFS@Home, two collaborations working for the Cunningham project

References

External links
Cunningham project homepage
Brent-Montgomery-te Riele table (Cunningham tables for higher bases)
Cunningham tables on Prime Wiki

Number theory